Abdulsalaam Selemani Amer (born 11 July 1963) is a Tanzanian CCM politician and Member of Parliament for Mikumi constituency since 2010.

References

1963 births
Living people
Tanzanian Muslims
Chama Cha Mapinduzi MPs
Tanzanian MPs 2010–2015
Forest Hill Secondary School alumni